The Food, Agriculture, Conservation, and Trade (FACT) Act of 1990 — P.L. 101-624 (November 28, 1990) was a 5-year omnibus farm bill that passed Congress and was signed into law.

This bill, also known as the 1990 farm bill, continued to move agriculture in a market-oriented direction by freezing target prices and allowing more planting flexibility.

Initial program 
New titles included rural development, forestry, organic certification (Title 21), and commodity promotion programs.  The law established a Rural Development Administration (RDA) in the USDA to administer programs relating to rural and small community development.  It extended and modified the Food Stamp Program and other domestic nutrition programs and made major changes in the operation of P.L. 480.  It revised existing law involving agricultural trade credits and guarantees. It also established that Forest Stewardship Program (FSP), the Forest Land Enhancement Program (FLEP), the Forest Legacy Program (FLP), and the Urban and Community Forestry Program (UCF).

Changes 
The 1990 farm bill was soon altered by the Food, Agriculture, Conservation, and Trade Act Amendments of 1991 (P.L. 102-237) to correct errors and alleviate problems in implementing the law.  The amendments allowed the Farm Credit Bank for Cooperatives to make loans for agricultural exports and established a new regulatory scheme and capital standards for the Federal Agricultural Mortgage Corporation (Farmer Mac).  The law also established new handling requirements for eggs to help prevent food-borne illness.

Further changes 
More policy changes were made by the Omnibus Budget Reconciliation Act (OBRA) of 1993 (P.L. 103-66).  This law intended to reduce federal farm spending by $3 billion over 5 years by eliminating USDA’s authority to waive minimum acreage set-aside requirements for wheat and corn, reducing deficiency payments to farmers participating in the 0/92 and 50/92 programs from 92% to 85% of the normal payment level, reducing the acreage to be enrolled in the Conservation Reserve Program and Wetlands Reserve Program, and requiring improvement in the actuarial soundness of the federal crop insurance program.  The measure provided for a temporary moratorium on sales of synthetic bovine growth hormone and reduced the loan rate for soybeans.  It reduced Market Promotion Program (MPP) funding through fiscal 1997 and provided for a series of significant MPP operational reforms.  It also provided for the designation of a series of rural (and urban) empowerment and enterprise zones, eligible for special federal aid and tax credits.

See also
Dairy Export Incentive Program
Integrated Farm Management Program

References

External links
 Food, Agriculture, Conservation, and Trade Act of 1990 (PDF/details) as amended in the GPO Statute Compilations collection

United States federal agriculture legislation